Indira A.R. Lakshmanan (born 1969) is a journalist and news executive based in Washington, D.C., who served as senior executive editor for National Geographic from 2020 to 2022.

Life 

Indira A.R. Lakshmanan was a National Merit Scholar and a Radcliffe National Scholar at Harvard University, where she was a magna cum laude graduate in the History of Art and Architecture.  She attended University of Oxford as a Rotary Scholar, and did graduate studies there in Latin American studies. In 2003, she was awarded a Nieman journalism fellowship at Harvard University.

Career 
She was a columnist for the Boston Globe, writing about foreign policy and politics, and Newmark Chair for Journalism Ethics at the Poynter Institute.  
She also worked as an executive editor at the Pulitzer Center. She also worked at Bloomberg News  and for The Boston Globe as a foreign correspondent. She is a sometime panelist on Washington Week on PBS.  Her Washington Week profile notes that "She has covered presidential campaigns and interviewed leaders in the U.S. and around the world, reporting from 80 countries on six continents. 
She has traveled with the campaigns of Barack Obama, Hillary Clinton, John McCain, and Mitt Romney, and traveled regularly with Secretaries of State Hillary Clinton and John Kerry for Bloomberg News, and interviewed Clinton more than a dozen times for Bloomberg TV, Radio and Businessweek."

References

External links 

 Bloomberg articles by Indira A.R. Lakshmanan
 Washington Week profile for Indira A.R. Lakshmanan
 Poynter posts by Indira A.R. Lakshmanan

1969 births
Living people
PBS people
The Boston Globe people
People from Washington, D.C.
Nieman Fellows
Alumni of the University of Oxford
Harvard College alumni